Nannosquillidae is a family of stomatopods, comprising the following genera:

Acanthosquilla Manning, 1963
Alachosquilla Schotte & Manning, 1993
Austrosquilla Manning, 1966
Bigelowina Schotte & Manning, 1993
Coronis Desmarest, 1823
Hadrosquilla Manning, 1966
Keppelius Manning, 1978
Mexisquilla Manning & Camp, 1981
Nannosquilla Manning, 1963
Nannosquilloides Manning, 1977
Platysquilla Manning, 1967
Platysquilloides Manning & Camp, 1981
Pullosquilla Manning, 1978

References

Stomatopoda
Crustacean families